Hungary competed at the 1988 Summer Olympics in Seoul, South Korea. The nation returned after the Soviet bloc boycott of the 1984 Summer Olympics. 188 competitors, 152 men and 36 women, took part in 135 events in 20 sports.

Medalists

Competitors
The following is the list of number of competitors in the Games.

Athletics

Men's 100 metres
Attila Kovács
István Tatár
György Fetter

Men's 200 metres
Attila Kovács

Men's 110 metres Hurdles
György Bakos

Men's 4×100 metres Relay
György Bakos
László Karaffa
István Tatár
Attila Kovács

Men's 3,000m Steeplechase
 Bela Vago
 Heat — did not start (→ did not advance)

Men's Long Jump 
 László Szalma
 Qualification — 7.91m
 Final — 8.00m (→ 6th place)

Men's Pole Vault
 István Bagyula

Men's Hammer Throw
 Tibor Gécsek
 Qualification — 77.12m
 Final — 78.36m (→ 6th place)

 Imre Szitás
 Qualification — 76.24m
 Final — 77.04m (→ 7th place)

 József Vida
 Qualification — 74.30m (→ did not advance)

Men's Decathlon 
 Dezső Szabó — 8093 points (→ 13th place)
 100 metres — 11.02s
 Long Jump — 7.29m
 Shot Put — 12.92m
 High Jump — 2.06m
 400 metres — 48.23s
 110m Hurdles — 14.96s
 Discus Throw — 39.54m
 Pole Vault — 5.00m
 Javelin Throw — 56.80m
 1.500 metres — 4:17.85s

Men's 20 km Walk
 Sándor Urbanik
 Final — 1:23:18 (→ 21st place)

Men's 50 km Walk
 Sándor Urbanik
 Final — did not finish (→ no ranking)

Women's Marathon 
 Karolina Szabo
 Final — 2"32.26 (→ 13th place)

Women's Javelin Throw
 Zsuzsa Malovecz
 Qualification — 64.30m
 Final — 54.58m (→ 12th place)

Boxing

Men's Light Flyweight (– 48 kg)
 Róbert Isaszegi →  Bronze Medal
 First Round — Bye
 Second Round — Defeated Colin Moore (Guyana), 5:0
 Third Round — Defeated Sadoon Abboud (Iraq), RSC-1
 Quarterfinals — Defeated Chatchai Sasakul (Thailand), 3:2
 Semifinals — Lost to Michael Carbajal (United States), 1:4

Men's Featherweight (– 57 kg)
 László Szőke
 First Round — Lost to John Wanjau (Kenya) on points

Canoeing

Cycling

One male cyclist represented Hungary in 1988.

Men's individual pursuit
 Miklós Somogyi

Men's point race
 Miklós Somogyi

Diving

Fencing

20 fencers, 15 men and 5 women, represented Hungary in 1988.

Men's foil
 Zsolt Érsek
 Róbert Gátai
 Pál Szekeres

Men's team foil
 Zsolt Érsek, Pál Szekeres, István Szelei, István Busa, Róbert Gátai

Men's épée
 Ernő Kolczonay
 Zoltán Székely
 Szabolcs Pásztor

Men's team épée
 László Fábián, Ferenc Hegedűs, Ernő Kolczonay, Szabolcs Pásztor, Zoltán Székely

Men's sabre
 György Nébald
 Imre Gedővári
 Imre Bujdosó

Men's team sabre
 György Nébald, Bence Szabó, Imre Bujdosó, Imre Gedővári, László Csongrádi

Women's foil
 Zsuzsa Némethné Jánosi
 Gertrúd Stefanek
 Edit Kovács

Women's team foil
 Zsuzsa Némethné Jánosi, Gertrúd Stefanek, Zsuzsa Szőcs, Katalin Tuschák, Edit Kovács

Gymnastics

Handball

Judo

Modern pentathlon

Three male pentathletes represented Hungary in 1988. János Martinek won an individual gold and the team also won gold too.

Men's Individual Competition:
 János Martinek — 5404 pts (→  Gold Medal)
 Attila Mizsér — 5281 pts (→ 4th place)
 László Fábián — 5201 pts (→ 7th place)

Men's Team Competition:
 Martinek, Mizser, and Fábián — 15886 pts (→  Gold Medal)

Rhythmic gymnastics

Rowing

Sailing

Shooting

Swimming

Men's 100 m Freestyle
 Mihály-Richard Bodór
 Heat — 52.77 (→ did not advance, 42nd place)

Men's 200 m Freestyle
 Zoltán Szilágyi
 Heat — 1:53.75 (→ did not advance, 34th place)

 Norbert Agh
 Heat — 1:54.72 (→ did not advance, 37th place)

Men's 200 m Freestyle
 Zoltán Szilágyi
 Heat — 1:53.75 (→ did not advance, 34th place)

 Norbert Agh
 Heat — 1:54.72 (→ did not advance, 37th place)

Men's 400 m Freestyle
 Valter Kalaus
 Heat — 3:53.44
 B-Final — 3:53.24 (→ 10th place)

 Zoltán Szilágyi
 Heat — 3:56.29
 B-Final — 3:56.00 (→ 16th place)

Men's 1500 m Freestyle
 Valter Kalaus
 Heat — 15:23.01 (→ did not advance, 15th place)

 Norbert Agh
 Heat — 15:52.80 (→ did not advance, 28th place)

Men's 100 m Backstroke
 Tamás Deutsch
 Heat — 58.65 (→ did not advance, 28th place)

Men's 200 m Backstroke
 Tamás Deutsch
 Heat — 2:03.17
 B-Final — 2:04.42 (→ 14th place)

 Tamás Darnyi
 Heat — DSQ (→ did not advance, no ranking)

Men's 100 m Breaststroke
 Károly Güttler
 Heat — 1:02.80
 Final — 1:02.05 (→  Silver Medal)

 Tamás Debnár
 Heat — 1:03.08
 Final — 1:02.50 (→ 5th place)

Men's 200 m Breaststroke
 József Szabó
 Heat — 2:14.97
 Final — 2:13.52 (→  Gold Medal)

 Péter Szabó
 Heat — 2:17.10
 Final — 2:17.12 (→ 8th place)

Men's 200 m Individual Medley
 Tamás Darnyi
 Heat — 2:02.15
 Final — 2:00.17 (→  Gold Medal)

 József Szabó
 Heat — 2:09.08 (→ did not advance, 23rd place)

Men's 400 m Individual Medley
 Tamás Darnyi
 Heat — 4:16.55
 Final — 4:14.75 (→  Gold Medal)

 József Szabó
 Heat — 4:20.85
 Final — 4:18.15 (→ 4th place)

Men's 4 × 100 m Medley Relay
 Tamás Deutsch, Károly Güttler, Valter Kalaus, and Mihály-Richard Bodór
 Heat — 3:52.24 (→ did not advance, 16th place)

Women's 400 m Freestyle
 Judit Csabai
 Heat — 4:25.52 (→ did not advance, 29th place)

Women's 800 m Freestyle
 Judit Csabai
 Heat — 8:56.37 (→ did not advance, 23rd place)

Women's 100 m Backstroke
 Krisztina Egerszegi
 Heat — 1:02.09
 Final — 1:01.56 (→  Silver Medal)

Women's 200 m Backstroke
 Krisztina Egerszegi
 Heat — 2:11.01
 Final — 2:09.29 (→  Gold Medal)

Women's 100 m Breaststroke
 Gabriella Csépe
 Heat — 1:11.10
 B-Final — 1:11.24 (→ 14th place)

Table tennis

Tennis

Water polo

Men's team competition
 Preliminary round (group B)
 Defeated Greece (12-10)
 Lost to Yugoslavia (9-10)
 Drew with Spain (6-6)
 Defeated China (14-7)
 Lost to United States (9-10)
 Classification Round (Group D)
 Drew with Italy (9-9)
 Defeated Australia (13-5) → 5th place

 Team roster
 Péter Kuna
 Gábor Bujka
 Gábor Schmiedt
 Zsolt Petőváry
 István Pintér
 Tibor Keszthelyi
 Balázs Vincze
 Zoltán Mohi
 Tibor Pardi
 László Tóth
 András Gyöngyösi
 Zoltán Kósz
 Imre Tóth
Head coach: Zoltan Kasas

Weightlifting

Wrestling

References

Nations at the 1988 Summer Olympics
Olympics
1988